The 2000 Copa Colsanitas was a women's tennis tournament played on outdoor clay courts at the Club Campestre El Rancho in Bogotá, Colombia that was part of the Tier IV category of the 2000 WTA Tour. It was the third edition of the tournament and was held from 7 February through 13 February 2000. Unseeded Patricia Wartusch won the singles title and earned $22,000.

Finals

Singles
 Patricia Wartusch defeated  Tathiana Garbin 4–6, 6–1, 6–4
 It was Wartusch's 1st singles title of her career.

Doubles
 Laura Montalvo /  Paola Suárez defeated  Rita Kuti-Kis /  Petra Mandula 6–4, 6–2

External links
 Official website 
 Official website 
 ITF tournament edition details
 Tournament draws

Copa Colsanitas
Copa Colsanitas
2000 in Colombian tennis